The theology on the body is a broad term for Catholic teachings on the human body. 

The dogma of the Assumption of the Blessed Virgin Mary, defined in Pope Pius XII's 1950 apostolic constitution Munificentissimus Deus, is one of the most recent developments in the Catholic theology of the body.

History
The theology of the body has a long history and tradition within the Catholic Church. Early Church fathers wrote on the role of the body and its relation to the soul, often elevating soul over body. But like the soul, it is also created by God in his image. This is considered important even today, as the existence of a soul is the basis for much Church teachings on the human body, in  areas such as abortion. Ambrose of Milan and Augustine of Hippo applied these views in their teachings on the human body, virginity and celibacy. Thomas Aquinas developed a systematic view, which dominated Church teachings and ecumenical councils including Vatican II. All recent popes contributed from different angles to the theology of the body. Current issues include the dignity of the body in light of its divine origin and destination, its eventual resurrection; virginity, the Christian sacrament of marriage, and derived issues such as faithfulness and contraception. Official Church teaching on the subject was stated in the encyclical Deus caritas est (On Christian Love) from Pope Benedict XVI, promulgated on Christmas, December 25, 2005.

Church fathers 
Some early Church fathers, like Origen  were preoccupied with the body and its impediments. The theology of early Church fathers focused on the body in terms of its origin, condition before the fall of man, and destination and relation to the soul. Questions were raised as to whether the body may impede the soul in its attempt to be the image of God. These questions, addressed  by the ancient Church, are relevant to a modern theology of the body, because they relate to concerns and definitions on the beginning and nature of human life.

Clement of Alexandria
Clement of Alexandria  (140?-220) viewed the body as the inferior partner in the body-soul relationship. The body tends to be sinful. The soul has three advantages over the body: it gives unity and life to the body; allows the body to reason; and is oriented towards God, while the body is oriented towards food and sex. The body is the grave of the soul, but also its home and vehicle.  Clement believed that the first humans were innocent until they were trapped by the pleasures of the body. The first humans, by misusing their body, misused their free will and sinned.

Origen 
Like  Clement, Origen (185-254?) was an African. Also like Clement, Origen considers the human body a prison of the soul. Only the soul existed in paradise, according to Origen, the body was taken on by Adam and  Eve; as they were cast out of paradise. The body tends to be oriented toward lust and sin, but it is also a creation of God. God created the body like a work of art in his image. This creation reflects God's intelligence. The human body is (eikon) somehow similar to God. To be completed as a mirror of him, is the task for every Christian. Unlike the human body,  the soul is an image of God. The body cannot be an image of God, otherwise God would look like a human being with a human body. Only the soul can see God, but it is caught between the flesh and spirit. It constantly has to make a choice between the two. Origen suggests, that Christians should free themselves from bodily restrictions as much as possible in this life. The body is important however,  in the context of resurrection. Origen believes that only  the resurrection of the body makes any sense. While he heeds Saint Paul, that the resurrection of the body will mean a new  body,  he insists, its identity  must be recognizable. Yet, he states, our hope for resurrection is not one for worms,  and our souls do not yearn for another decayable body.

Irenaeus

The body, formed in the image of God, and the soul, which has adopted the Spirit of the Father, in harmony, make up the perfect human being, according to Irenaeus (died around 202). The Greek Gnosis and some Christians had looked down on the human body as inferior. Irenaeus defends the body  because it is the creation of God and a negative view would cast shadows both over God and his creation. The story of creation in the book Genesis (later quoted by Pope John Paul in his lectures on the body)  shows, that the first human being, Adam, was indeed an image of God.  Adam had supernatural life, immortality, super-natural sanctity and a closeness to God. Since he was free of the human need to sleep, he could see God without interruption. By giving in to temptation, he lost all these attributes.

The importance of Christ for the human body is the restoration of the original status before the fall. Those who accept Christ are redeemed  and become children of God, regaining eternal life.  However those who live only by their body and its needs, will not share eternal life. The resurrected bodies will show  beauty beyond human  imagination. To show the way to this destination, the Son of God became human, and accepted the human body,  thus helping human beings to recognize their destination in God. Only by subjugating one's will to the will of God, can this destination be reached, according to Irenaeus.

Irenaeus believed that the first humans, Adam and Eve had a childlike relation to their body. They had no idea of evil, concupiscence and lust. They enjoyed a balanced sexuality, not ashamed as they kissed  or hugged each other. According to Irenaeus, the fall was a result of a childish lack of discretion, which made Adam susceptible to the devil and led him into disobedience to God. The fall was a result of naïveté, not of bad intention, according to Irenaeus.

Didymus the Blind
Didymus the Blind (died around 398), who  lived and taught in Alexandria, was blinded at the age of five.  God,  according to Didymus, created the human being with body and soul, both good, until the fall by Adam and Eve. Didymus believed that the soul continues to be an image of God, while the body does not. The unity of body and soul is therefore for Didymus a degradation for the soul. Limited by the body, it cannot develop.  Whenever something higher mixes with something lower, an inferior mix is the consequence according to Didymus. He compares this with wine being mixed with water.

The body has some functions for the soul. The body informs the soul of the sensual world around them. Didymus called the body the outer person and the soul the inner person.  The outer person is perishable. The inner person is eternal. The heart of the person  leads the person as a whole towards good or bad deeds.  Didymus maintains freedom of will, which is however weakened  through the fall of Adam of Eve. A person who uses his free will to be a spiritual person, dominating all subordinate material instincts, becomes similar to God. This similarity must be goal of all human undertaking.

Gregory of Nazianzus
Gregory of Nazianzus (330-390) contemplated  on the origin of the human body. Man was created by God with body and soul, a visible and invisible part, like the angels. He was created to praise God like they did. The body was given to man, so he may suffer and eventually die, and thus not consider himself to be God. The material essence of the body separates us from God, like a cloud, or, as Gregory stated, like the cloud between the Egyptians and the Israelites.

By giving man a perishable body, man was saved from the deep fall of Lucifer into eternal damnation. Gregory does not describe the human body before the fall, but he states that the bodily existence of man was free of any illness, needs or problems. The human body was related to God and free of sin towards him. The fall consisted in false pride, a revolt against God.

Regarding the relation between body and soul, Gregory states, the body is related to the soul, like the way in which the soul is related to God. To explain human existence, Gregory uses the concept of light: God is the most sublime light, He cannot be penetrated or defined. He is followed by the angels, and then by human beings. Man is the image of God but only in his soul, not in his body. He is therefore also a mixture of eternal and temporal. The grace of God created the soul of man. His body was created for suffering, to overcome his pride. The soul is destined to lead the body and be purified like gold in a fire. The soul is oriented towards God and yearns to communicate with him. The human body is the lower element of the human person. Through the body, man experiences his temporal existence. But Gregory also admired human beauty and the bodily abilities to dream, sleep and memorize. The body can be both a friend and enemy of a person, according to Gregory. The final goal is a unity of the soul with God, which is possible with Grace and the assistance of the Holy Spirit according to Gregory.

Gregory of Nyssa
Gregory of Nyssa (335-394) was a bishop who wrote, among others, about the creation of the human body. Unlike Irenaeus, Gregory states, that the soul does not need to acquire the vision of God; it has this vision from the beginning. The mixing with body and material things let the soul deviate from its divine vision and fall. Human efforts must therefore be oriented toward recreating this vision and thus participating in the Divine life. This can be done, so Gregory, by turning away from evil, and returning to God. A human being is defined not by his/her body but by his/her soul, with its spiritual and intellectual capacities. The soul alone is in the image of God. Gregory also has a positive image of man by stating his freedom and independence. God is truly free and the freedom of man, even if limited, is an image of God. Not only his freedom, but also his ability to love  - God is love -  and his immortality, make man an image of God.

Regarding the human body, Gregory opines that it is created for procreation. In that, humans are like animals; however, the human body also has the capacity for reasoning and perception. The body has three forms of life: the vegetative, sensual and intellectual. The human body derives its dignity from the fact that the Son of God had adopted it. But Gregory also considers the human body a heavy weight on the soul. The destination of man is to achieve similarity to God, through purification. Sin, passion and ambition must be renounced. The sacraments of the Church are a great help. Gregory argues that God's grace, not man's efforts, determines an individual's ability to see God. God draws man upwards towards him. He climbs step by step, without knowing where he is going. The soul is driven by its love for him, whom it has not found. The love of God, so Gregory, increases in the soul, the more it knows him.

Ambrose of Milan 
To Ambrose of Milan, the body lives in a duality with the soul and must be subjugated. Control of the body is essential for Christian life. Total control is virginity.  Virginity and perfect chastity consecrated to the service of God allows the body to become the image of God. It is to Ambrose one of  the most precious treasures which Christ  has left as his  heritage to the Church. He asserted that perpetual virginity is a noble gift which the Christian religion has bestowed on the world. Virginity is not new or even Christian. Pagans imposed this way of life on the Vestals for a certain time. Ambrose writes, "We read that also in the temple of Jerusalem there were virgins. But what does the Apostle say? 'Now all these things happened to them in figure', that this might be a foreshadowing of what was to come." "Mary is the model of virginity: No wonder that the Lord, wishing to rescue the world, began his work with Mary. Thus she, through whom salvation was being prepared for all people, would be the first to receive the promised fruit of salvation."

"To sow the seeds of perfect purity and to arouse a desire for virginity has always belonged to the function of the priesthood."

Augustine of Hippo
Augustine is the father of many contemporary theological views on the body. He  dwelled at length on the condition of the human body before and after the fall. He was convinced that the heavenly state consisted in complete control of mind over body, especially in the area of sexuality. To illustrate this point, he notes, that some people can wiggle with their ears, nose or even hair, completely at their will. This condition of complete freedom and absence of lust existed for human sexuality too before the fall. The body must be controlled, and therefore Augustine like his teacher Ambrose considered  virginity of the human body the superior way of Christ. He considered  matrimony a triple blessing in  light of its offspring, conjugal faith and being a sacrament: "In conjugal faith it is provided that there should be no carnal intercourse outside the marriage bond with another man or woman; with regard to offspring, that children should be begotten of love, tenderly cared for and educated in a religious atmosphere; finally, in its sacramental aspect that the marriage bond should not be broken and that a husband or wife, if separated, should not be joined to another even for the sake of offspring. This we regard as the law of marriage by which the fruitfulness of nature is adorned and the evil of incontinence is restrained."

He quoted St Paul saying that young girls should marry, arguing that they "should bear children to be mothers of families". Augustine was one of the first and most important Church fathers who wrote, that contraception is wrong: "Intercourse even with one's legitimate wife is unlawful and wicked where the conception of the offspring is prevented. Onan, the son of Juda, did this and the Lord killed him for it."

Thomas Aquinas

Man the image of God
Thomas Aquinas deals with a number of questions, most importantly, the question of man as image of God.

Since man is said to be the image of God by reason of his intellectual nature, he is the most perfectly like God according to that in which he can best imitate God in his intellectual nature. Now the intellectual nature imitates God chiefly in this, that God understands and loves Himself. Wherefore we see that the image of God is in man in three ways.

This means, according to Thomas, that man has a natural aptitude for recognizing, understanding and loving God. However, he requires His grace to do those things perfectly so he can finally attain "the likeness of glory".

Animals, the likeness of God 
But are animals also created in the image of God? Thomas has a unique answer: 
in all creatures there is some kind of likeness to God, he argued. But in the thinking person, whom he called "the rational creature", there is a likeness of "image"; whereas in other creatures we find a likeness by way of a "trace". Thomas explains the difference between trace and image. "An 'image' represents something by likeness in species [...]; while a 'trace' represents something by way of an effect, which represents the cause in such a way as not to attain to the likeness of species."

Pope Pius XI 
Catholic doctrine from early on and supported by the Council of Trent, considered virginity  to be the holiest state for humans; however, marriage was allowed for those without the fortitude required to live an abstinent life. In Casti connubii, Pius XI repeatedly quotes Augustine, who teaches, that  among the blessings of marriage, the child holds the first place. Pius XI also followed Augustine in upholding  the  indissolubility  of marriage and the wrongfulness of sexual acts that impede conception:

Small wonder, therefore, if Holy Writ bears witness that the Divine Majesty regards with greatest detestation this horrible crime and at times has punished it with death. As St. Augustine notes, "Intercourse, even with one's legitimate wife, is unlawful and wicked where the conception of the offspring is prevented.

Following this argument, Pius XI  repeats  that the conjugal act is intrinsically tied with procreation, but also acknowledges the unitive aspect of intercourse as licit. The encyclical affirms the Church's opposition to adultery and divorce, and  speaks out against the eugenics laws, popular at that time, that forbade those deemed "unfit" from marrying and having children.

Pope Pius XII
Pope Pius XII in the years 1939-1942 delivered a series of lectures to the newly married couples of Rome which for decades became the basis for marital instruction in the US. Like Popes before him, and following the teachings of the Council of Trent, Pope Pius explained in Sacra virginitas that virginity is superior to marriage. He also rejects the view that the human body needs fulfillment of the sexual instinct for the sake of one's mental or physical health, or for the harmony of one's personality. In this context he criticized the cult of the body and disorderly love of oneself.

Ethics
In a 1951 speech to midwives, Pius XII stressed the inviolability of the human body as a creation of God and stated his opposition to all forms of genetic mercy killings. The right to life comes directly from God, not from the parents. He rejected any kind of sterilization as well. Like Pius XI, he extolled the sanctity of the sacrament of marriage, a place for peace and love, requiring often heroism by both partners. Parents have a role, not only to give physical love, but also to give spiritual life to their offspring. Pius criticized the traditional male role in marriage, stating that while the male member is head of the family, he should also participate in domestic chores, especially within families, where the mother is working full-time. Pius XII demands equal pay for equal work.

Family planning 
Regarding natural family planning methods, Pope Pius XII distinguished between engaging in sexual intercourse during infertile days and the specific selection of these days for intercourse. He argued that, if a marital partner entered marriage with the intention to have intercourse only during infertile days in order to avoid having offspring, the marriage contract itself would be invalid. If, on the other hand, the marital partner has intercourse during infertile days only occasionally but not exclusively, then the marriage is legitimate. The intention, not the actual use of marital rights, is decisive. Pius XII illustrates this with the notion that marriage includes both rights and obligations.

Abstinence within marriage is also highlighted in his teachings. Pius took issue with the argument that abstinence is an impossibly heroic act. Citing Augustine, he argued that if natural union is not possible, abstinence is required. And, he added, in the time of World War II, so many acts of real heroism were required of men and women in so many countries, against which sexual abstinence paled in comparison. The human body and its needs should not be the centre of gratification but need to be sublimated to spiritual priorities that reflect the divine design and destiny. Marriage is not the highest value and human dignity must be preserved and applied in the marital act. The teachings of the Church reject a hedonistic view of the human body, while recognizing and valuing its divine origin and dignity. The Church thus protects the dignity of men against an over-emphasis on sensuality.

Body and soul
Early Church writers, while defining the position of the body within theology, had focused a great deal of attention on the creation of body and soul. "The body of man was created by God" (de fide) according to the  teachings of two ecumenical councils Lateran IV and Vatican I.

Pope Pius XII taught that the question of the origin of man's body from pre-existing and living matter is a legitimate matter of inquiry for natural science. Catholics are free to form their own opinions, but they should do so cautiously; they should not confuse fact with conjecture, and they should respect the Church's right to define matters touching on Revelation. For these reasons, the Teaching Authority of the Church does not forbid that, in conformity with the present state of human sciences and sacred theology, research and discussions, on the part of men experienced in both fields, take place with regard to the doctrine of evolution, in as far as it inquires into the origin of the human body as coming from pre-existent and living matter - for the Catholic faith obliges us to hold that souls are immediately created by God. In an October 22, 1996, address to the Pontifical Academy of Sciences, Pope John Paul II repeated the position of Pius XII adding:

In his encyclical Humani generis (1950), my predecessor Pius XII has already affirmed that there is no conflict between evolution and the doctrine of the faith regarding man and his vocation, provided that we do not lose sight of certain fixed points....Today, more than a half-century after the appearance of that encyclical, some new findings lead us toward the recognition of evolution as more than an hypothesis.

Mary and the resurrection of the body 
To the Catholic Church, Pius XII's 1950 dogma of the Assumption is proof for the resurrection of the body from the dead. Pius was confident that the solemn proclamation and definition of the Assumption would contribute in no small way to the advantage of human society and individuals. He hoped that those who meditate upon the Assumption of Mary will be better able to withstand the pressures of a material life style, and look instead at the true destination of their own bodies:

...in this magnificent way all may see clearly to what a lofty goal our bodies and souls are destined. Finally it is our hope that belief in Mary's bodily Assumption into heaven will make our belief in our own resurrection stronger and render it more effective.

...by the authority of our Lord Jesus Christ, of the Blessed Apostles Peter and Paul, and by our own authority, we pronounce, declare, and define it to be a divinely revealed dogma: that the Immaculate Mother of God, the ever Virgin Mary, having completed the course of her earthly life, was assumed body and soul into heavenly glory.Hence if anyone, which God forbid, should dare willfully to deny or to call into doubt that which we have defined, let him know that he has fallen away completely from the divine and Catholic Faith.

Pope Paul VI 
The central document of Pope Paul VI is Humanae vitae. The Pope begins with the statement that "the  transmission of human life is a most serious role in which married people collaborate freely and responsibly with God the Creator." He claims that this is a source of great joy to them, although it means many difficulties and hardships. But there are global perspectives. A rapid increase in population has created the spectre of a world without food and other resources for all, and a temptation for State authorities to clamp down on population increase with drastic measures. The role of woman in society has been changing drastically; but most importantly, according to the encyclical, the advent of birth control devices requires a position on the part of the magisterium of  the Church.

Limited rights over the body 
The Pope points to some Catholic dogma. Human procreation, like all questions of life, is a part of God's loving design. Married life takes its origin from God, who "is love." Husband and wife cooperate with God in the generation and rearing of new lives. Married love must therefore be more than a question of natural instinct or emotional drive. It is faithful and exclusive until death. Parents are not free to act as they choose in the service of transmitting life, as if it were wholly up to them to decide what is the right course to follow. Observing the Natural Law means that each and every marital act must of necessity retain its intrinsic relationship to the procreation of human life.

Faithfulness to God's Design means to experience married love while respecting the laws of conception and to acknowledge that one is not the master of the sources of life but rather the minister of the design established by the Creator. All artificial birth control methods are unlawful as are all specifically intended to prevent procreation—whether as an end or as a means. Lawful Therapeutic Means are permitted if necessary to cure bodily diseases, even if a foreseeable impediment to procreation should result, provided such impediment is not directly intended for any motive whatsoever. Recourse to Infertile Periods applies to the spacing of births, arising from the physical or psychological condition of the husband or wife, or from external circumstances. The Church teaches that married people may then take advantage of the natural cycle. Scientists, as already requested by Pius XII, should study  natural rhythms as a secure basis for the limitation of offspring.

Control of the body 
Pope Paul fully realizes that Humanae vitae is not easy to follow. Some may argue that it teaches the impossible. He discusses the value of self-discipline of the body and self-denial of bodily pleasures as a source of family tranquility, peace, and personality development within the family. He recommends chastity within marriage and appeals to public authorities not to tolerate any legislation that would introduce into the family practices that are opposed to the natural law of God.

Social and economic development
The Pope is fully aware of the developmental implications of this teaching. Regarding worldwide development he quotes Pope John XXIII that no solution  is acceptable which violates man's essential dignity by reducing him to a materialistic concept. The only possible solution is social and economic progress of individuals and society, which respects and promotes true human values. This excludes misguided governmental policies, a lack of social justice, a selfish accumulation of  material  goods,  and  a  failure  raise  the  standard  of  living  of  people  and  their children. The Pope sees a great potential for  governments, national aid programs and especially for international aid organizations.

Christian compassion
Christian couples face great difficulties at times: husbands and wives should take up the burden appointed to them: married couples should communicate their own experience to others. Thus  the lay vocation will be included a novel and outstanding form of the apostolate. Christian Compassion must be the guiding light. The Pope teaches that this doctrine of Christ on love and the uses of the body must always be joined with tolerance and charity:

As Christ Himself showed in His conversations and dealings with men. For when He came, not to judge, but to save the world, was He not bitterly severe toward sin, but patient and abounding in mercy toward sinners?

Pope John Paul II

John Paul II continued on the Catholic theology of the body of his predecessors with a series of lectures, entitled the Theology of the Body, in which he talked about an original unity between man and women, purity of heart (on the Sermon on the Mount), marriage and celibacy and reflections on Humane Vitae, focusing largely on responsible parenthood and marital chastity. He links "the original unity of man and women" with the book of Genesis, and raises in this context questions such as why Christ put so much emphasis on human beings as male and female. He argues, Man becomes the Image of God in the moment of holy communion.

Pope Benedict XVI
In 2005, Pope Benedict XVI took up the concerns of his predecessors in his first encyclical, Deus caritas est, where he raises some questions regarding Eros, body and the Church. ("Did Christianity destroy eros?" "Doesn't the Church, with all her commandments and prohibitions, turn to bitterness the most precious thing in life? Doesn't she blow the whistle just when the joy which is the Creator's gift offers us a happiness which is itself a certain foretaste of the Divine?")

Deus caritas est 
Benedict accepts that events in real life often just happen, rather than being planned or willed. What is imposed, is not voluntary. The encyclical does not mention the teachings of the Popes Pius XI through John Paul II on birth control and natural family planning. John Paul II is, however, praised for his social teachings, on poverty and so on. The encyclical focuses on a broad concept of love and not on prohibitions and definitions, which may anger some segments of the public. Benedict distances himself from "my sinful body, my enemy" views, but goes further when he warns against radical distinctions of "good love", Agape, and "bad" or "dirty" love, eros and Sex. Benedict, while clearly recognizing degrading sexual misuses, complains that in the past these good-bad distinctions have often been radicalized within the Catholic Church. This is dangerous, because:

Were this... to be taken to extremes, the essence of Christianity would be detached from the vital relations fundamental to human existence, and would become a world apart, admirable perhaps, but decisively cut off from the complex fabric of human life.

40th anniversary of Humanae vitae 
The principles of Catholic faith are old as the scriptures, Benedict states. The Pope intends to focus on these eternal principles of Catholic faith. On May 12, 2008, he accepted an invitation to talk participants in the International Congress organized by the Pontifical Lateran University on the 40th anniversary of Humanae vitae. He put the encyclical, which in his view, was very poorly understood, in the broader view of love in a global context, a topic, which he called – "so controversial, yet so crucial for humanity's future." Humanae vitae became "a sign of contradiction but also of continuity of the Church's doctrine and tradition... What was true yesterday is true also today". The Church continues to reflect "in an ever new and deeper way on the fundamental principles that concern marriage and procreation”. The key message of Humanae vitae is love. Benedict states, that the fullness of a person is achieved by a unity of soul and body, but neither spirit nor body alone can love, only the two together. If this unity is broken, if only the body is satisfied, love becomes a commodity.  Ultimately, Benedict says, Christian love grows out the love of Christ.

References

 Arthur Fridolin Utz, Joseph Fulko Groner, Aufbau und Entfaltung des Gesellschaflichen Lebens, Soziale Summe Pius XII, Freiburg, Schweiz, 1954, 1961
Boniface Ramsey, Beginning to Read the Fathers, Paulist Press

 
Christian anthropology
Catholic theology and doctrine